The Namibian Defence Force (NDF) comprises the national military forces of Namibia. It was created when the country, then known as South West Africa, gained independence from South Africa in 1990. Chapter 15 of the Constitution of Namibia establishes the NDF and defines its role and purpose as, " ... to defend the territory and national interests of Namibia".

Namibia's military was born from the integration of the formerly belligerent People's Liberation Army of Namibia (PLAN), military wing of the South West African People's Organization, and the South West African Territorial Force (SWATF) – a security arm of the former South African administration. The British formulated the force integration plan and began training the NDF, which consists of five battalions and a small headquarters element. The United Nations Transitional Assistance Group (UNTAG)'s Kenyan infantry battalion remained in Namibia for three months after independence to assist in training the NDF and stabilize the north. Martin Shalli and Charles 'Ho Chi Minh' Namoloh were involved in the negotiations that allowed the Kenyan infantry battalion to remain for that period.

Purpose
The main roles of the Namibian Defence Force are to ensure the sovereignty and territorial integrity of the country by guarding against external aggression, both conventional and unconventional; prevent violation of Namibia's territorial integrity; and provide assistance to civil authorities in guarding and protecting government buildings and key installations as provided in the Defence Act.

Defence spending and percentage of GDP included $90 million in 1997/98, 2.6% of GDP. The 73.1 million figure in 2002 was 2.4% of GDP. These figures are almost certainly CIA World Factbook estimates.

History

Major General A W Dennis, CB, OBE (rtd), British Army, previously Director of Military Assistance Overseas, made the following comments on the initial phase in Namibia at a conference in Pretoria, South Africa on 6 August 1992:

You will no doubt recall that the Angola accords were signed in Luanda on 22 December 1988. In November 1989 SWAPO won 57% of the votes in the Namibian General Election and immediately requested the help of a British Military Advisory and Training Team following independence on 21 March 1990. The team, initially 55 strong, was duly deployed on 26 March 1990 and the first leaders cadre, for the 1st and 2nd Battalions, was run from 17 April to 2 June. By 1 July, the 1st Battalion, about 1 000 men strong, accompanied by 5 BMATT Advisors, had deployed to the northern border. By November 1990, only four months later, the 5th Battalion had deployed and in early 1991 the 21st Guards Battalion had also been formed, four staff courses had been run, support weapons and logistics training was well advanced (indeed a logistics battalion deployed as early as July 1990) and an operational test exercise had been conducted. In addition the Ministry of Defence, a mixture of civilian and military personnel, was operating as a department of state. No-one would pretend that everything was working perfectly, nevertheless, a great deal had been achieved in the first year following independence. Most people would probably agree that at some 7 500 strong the Army is unnecessarily large, but sensible plans will need to be made for the employment of any surplus soldiers before they are discharged. Integration has not been easy to achieve, at least in part, because of the need to use several interpreters to cope with the wide variety of languages involved. Battalions are made up of approximately 70% ex-PLAN and 30% ex-SWATF. This mixture could have proved explosive but hounded by their BMATT instructors they united in a common task (or perhaps in the face of a common enemy!) and soon realised that they could work well together. At the higher levels, integration has been more patchy, at least in part because of the departure of most white South African and SWATF officers. But the Government's intentions seem clear in that it decided to split the four MOD directorates evenly, appointing two white and two black (ex PLAN) directors. In all this, BMATT Namibia has played a role remarkably similar to that of BMATT Zimbabwe.

In August 1999, a separatist Lozi faction in the Caprivi Strip launched a coup attempt (see Caprivi conflict) which was summarily put down by the Namibian Defence Force. The army has conducted security operations along the northern border with Angola. In the process of these operations, there were allegations in 2001 that the army has tortured people suspected of being UNITA sympathisers. IRIN reported that the Ministry of Defence had admitted that two Namibian soldiers died fighting suspected UNITA rebels in southern Angola in July 2001.

On 24 May 2010, Chen Bingde, Chief of the General Staff Department of the People's Liberation Army and member of the Central Military Commission, met Charles Namoloh and Peter Nambundunga, acting commander of the Namibian Defence Forces, in Windhoek. At their meeting, the two sides had in-depth discussions on further strengthening exchanges and cooperation between the two armed forces. Chen was accompanied by the chief of staff of the Second Artillery Corps and two PLA Military Region chiefs of staff. Chen also met President Pohamba that day.

In 2012, NDF officials announced the suspension of its recruitment campaign due to a lack of "accommodation facilities" for new personnel for a two-year period. The suspension, however, did not include the recruitment of specialist personnel as the Namibian Navy in 2013 had a recruitment exercise for sailors(officers and men) and marines. In 2014, recruitment resumed after accommodation issues were resolved.

Organization and structure
The Chief Of Defence Force is the highest-ranking officer and exercises overall executive command of the force. Service chiefs are two-star general officers, air officers and flag officers in command of their respective arms of service. NDF directorates are led by one-star general officers, air officers and flag officers. The exception, however, is the Joint Operations Directorate, whose head is a major general. The Joint Operations Directorate is responsible for force deployment in the Military.

Chief of Defence Force: Air Marshal Martin Pinehas
Army Commander: Major-General Aktofel Nambahu
Air Force Commander: Air Vice Marshal Teofilus Shaende 
Navy Commander: Rear Admiral Alweendo Amungulu
Chief of Staff; Joint Operations: Maj Gen Joshua Ndandalwakwasha Namhindo
Chief of Staff; Human Resources: Air Cdre Retoveni Muhenje
Chief of Staff; Defence Intelligence: Rear Admrl (JG) S.S. Hangula
Chief of Staff; Defence Health Services: Brig Gen Dr. S.S. Ndeitunga
Chief of Staff; Information & Communication Technology:
Chief of Staff; Logistics: 
Chief of Staff; Defence Inspector General:

Chief of Defence Force

The Chief of the Defence Force (Namibia) is always a commissioned three star General/Air/Flag Officer from the officer corps. The first chief of the NDF was Lieutenant-General Dimo Hamaambo. He was previously the leader of PLAN, and a survivor of the Battle of Cassinga. Lieutenant-General Hamaambo was the first to be laid to rest at the Heroes' Acre memorial outside Windhoek, a few days after its official opening in 2002. Lieutenant-General Solomon Huwala replaced Hamaambo as Chief of the NDF on Hamaambo's retirement. After Lieutenant-General Huwala retired in October 2006, Lieutenant General Martin Shalli headed the NDF.

President Hifikepunye Pohamba suspended Lieutenant-General Shalli from his post as Chief of Defence Force in 2009 over corruption allegations, dating back to the time when Shalli served as Namibia's High Commissioner to Zambia. During the time of the suspension, Army Commander Major General Peter Nambundunga acted as Chief. Shalli was eventually forced to retire in January 2011; the post of Chief of the NDF was given to Epaphras Denga Ndaitwah. Ndaitwah served until 31 December 2013 when the NDF Chief's position was given to Maj Gen John Mutwa.

As of February 2012, it was reported that a Chinese company paid US$499,950 into Shalli's account in Zambia while he was the NDF chief. Poly Technologies was supplying equipment to the NDF at the time.
1990–2000 Lieutenant-General Dimo Hamaambo, Namibian Army.
2000–2006 Lieutenant-General Solomon Huwala, Namibian Army.
2006–2011 Lieutenant-General Martin Shalli, Namibian Army.
2011–2013 Lieutenant-General Epaphras Denga Ndaitwah, Namibian Army.
2013–2020 Lieutenant-General John Mutwa, Namibian Army.
2020 – Incumbent Air Marshal Martin Pinehas, Namibian Air Force.

NDF Sergeant Major

NDF Sergeant Major is the highest appointment a Non Commission Officer may receive. Duties of the NDF Sergeant Major includes making sure that discipline, drills, dressing code, performance
standards and morale of the non-commissioned officers are maintained. The current NDF Sergeant Major is Warrant Officer Class 1 (WO1) Leonard Iiyambo. He had succeeded WO1 Albert Siyaya, who in turn took over from retired Namibian Navy WO1 Isak Nankela.

Previous Sergeant Major are:
1990–1997 WO1 retired K. Lossen, Namibian Army
1997–2000 Late WO1 retired A.H.Vatileni, Namibian Army
2000–2007 WO1 retired E.K. Mutota, Namibian Army
2007–2011 WO1 retired D.J. Angolo, Namibian Navy
2011–2017 WO1 retired Isak Nankela, Namibian Air Force
2017–2018 WO1 Albert Siyaya, Namibian Air Force
2018–2019 WO1 Leonard Iiyambo, Namibian Army
2019– Incumbent WO1 Joseph Nembungu, Namibian Air Force

Joint Operations Directorate

The Joint Operations Directorate is the only directorate headed by a two star Flag/Air/General Officer. Its role is to coordinate and conduct combined Operations, implement plans and doctrines in the force. The first Director of Operation in 1990 was Brigadier General Martin Shalli.

Defence Health Services

The Force's Defence Health Services provides medical services to service personnel, it operates sick bays at all bases and units as well the military hospitals.

Logistics Directorate
The Logitistcs Directorate is responsible for the supplying materiel to the force.The first Director for Logistics was Colonel Peter Nambundunga

Defence Inspectorate

The Defence Inspector General's Directorate is responsible for maintaining the efficiency and effectivennes of the Force. It also investigates both internal and external complaints. The current Defence inspector General is Brigadier General Fiina Amupolo.

Namibian Defence Force ranks
NDF ranks are based on the Commonwealth rank structure. There is no approved four-star general rank in the NDF. The Chief of Defence Force is a singular appointment that comes with an elevation to the rank of lieutenant general for an Army officer, air marshal for an Air Force officer and vice admiral for a Navy officer. Arms of services commanders i.e. Army, Air Force and Navy commanders, have a rank of major general, air vice marshal and rear admiral. The rank of brigadier has also been transformed into brigadier general. Directorate heads are always brigadier generals, i.e. the Chief of Staff for Defence Intelligence.

Warrant Officer Class 1 Appointments
Any warrant officer class 1 could be posted to substantive posts, including

Army

The landward arm of service for the Defence force is the Namibian Army, it is also the largest of the NDF's service branches.

Air Force

The aerial warfare branch is small, but was bolstered with deliveries of some fighter jets in 2006 and 2008.

Navy

Development of the maritime warfare branch has been slow, and the force was only formally established in 2004, 14 years after independence. Today, it numbers over 1100 personnel and deploys a small number of lightly armed patrol vessels. Extensive Brazilian aid assisted in its development.

Joint Headquarters
The Joint Headquarters is an Arm of Service level institution in the Defence Force and is created by the Minister of Defence in terms of section 13 of the Defence Act.

Training Institutions

Army Battle School
Situated at the Oshivelo Army base, the school offers units and battle groups to test their combat fighting skills in conventional and non-conventional warfare. The school also offers courses such as:
Company Group Commander Course(CGC)
Platoon commander Course(PCC)
Platoon Sgt Commanders Course
Section Commanders Course

Army Technical Training Centre
Established in 2011 the technical centre impart students with knowledge repair and maintain army systems and installations. The centre was commissioned on 27 February 2015.

Military School Okahandja
The Namibian Military School is the main training and academic unit of the Namibian Defence Force. It offers Officer Cadets and NDF officers an opportunity to get a military-oriented academic qualification. Training and teaching in the institution ranges from Basic Military Training to technical mechanical training.

Namibia Command and Staff College

The Namibia Command and Staff College offers the Junior Staff Course (JSC) and the Senior Command and Staff Course (SCSC). It provides staff training to prepare students for staff appointments.

Parachute Training School
The force's parachute airborne school is based at the Grootfontein Air Force Base. Here students from all service branches are training to qualify as Parachute specialists. The school was set up with help by the South African private military parachute training company Chute Systems who are training Namibia's airborne forces and associated staff e.g. parachute riggers.

Naval Training School

Established on 22 November 2009, the Naval Training School was commissioned by President Hage Geingob on 22 July 2016. Administratively divided into two sections, Sailors Training Wing and Marine Training Wing. It offers the following courses:
 Basic Seamanship Course
Specialization Course
Section Commander Course.
Marine Petty officers course
Sailors Petty officers Course

School of Air Power Studies
The School of Air Power Studies run in conjunction with the Namibia Aviation Training Academy trains Pilots and Technicians.

School of Military Science
The School of Military Science, run in conjunction with the University of Namibia, offers officers in the Defence force qualifications ranging from bachelor of Science Honors' degrees in the field of nautical, Army and Aeronautical, to a post-graduate diploma in Security and strategics studies, and a Master of Arts in Security and Strategic Studies (MA-SSS).

School of Signals

The School of Signals provides training to all personnel wishing to specialize in the communications field. The signals school was formed in 2015 from the old Signals Training Wing and Computer Training Centre of the military school. The school is co-located at the military school. It consists of four wings, one administration wing and three training wings. The school offers the following courses:
Communication Courses
Signal Officers Courses
Computer Courses

See also
List of Namibian Generals
List of Namibian admirals
List of Namibian Air Officers

References

Notes

Further reading
 Stephen F. Burgess, 'Fashioning Integrated Security Forces after Conflict', African Security, 1: 2, 69–91 (2008)
 Greg Mills, BMATT and Military Integration in South Africa, South African Defence Review, Issue 2, 1992 Covers reformation of Namibian Defence Force and British involvement
 Case studies in war-to-peace transition: the demobilization and reintegration of ex-combatants in Ethiopia, Namibia, and Uganda
 Thomas Jan Lambert, Criminal Justice in the Namibian Defence Force, LAP Lambert Academic Publishing, 2010
 Peter Batchelor, Kees Kingma, Guy Lamb, Demilitarisation and Peace-building in Southern Africa: The role of the military in state formation and nation-building, Ashgate Publishing, Ltd., 2004
 Donna Pankhurst, "Namibia," in Peacekeeping in Africa, eds. Oliver Furley and Roy May (Aldershot, UK: Ashgate, 1998)
 Informante, Marine Corps commander accused of favouritism, 3 October 2012

External links
Namibian Defence Force camouflage patterns

Military of Namibia